"Dans ma fusée" ("In my Rocket") is a 2005 song recorded by the French singer Ilona. It was the third single from her debut album Un Monde parfait and was released on 17 October 2005. It was less successful as the two previous singles, but was after all a hit in France where it peaked at number three.

Background and lyrics
The song was composed in Italy and in France by Laurent Jeanne, Mixivan and Domydee and produced by Ivan Russo. Maïlis Mitrecey, Ilona's sister, participated in the background vocals. In the song, Ilona explains she likes to travel in her rocket and mentions various stars and planets.

As for the previous two singles, the music video was produced as an animated feature in which the singer's appears a few seconds, on a giant screen, at the beginning. This video was also included on the DVD Un Monde parfait. A CD maxi, only released in limited edition, was edited by Atollo, on 9 December 2005, about two months after the single release, but only available in limited edition.

The song was covered in Chinese-language by the band The Flowers (花儿乐队) under the title "Yêu hành tây" (愛上洋蔥) as third track on its album Flower Age Pageant, released on 28 September 2007.

Charts performances
In France, the single entered the SNEP chart at a peak of number three on 22 October 2005, selling 17,187 units, before dropping (then number six, with 15,704 sales ; number seven, with 14,230 sales ; number eight, with 13,839 sales). It totaled four weeks in the top ten, 14 weeks in the top 50, 21 weeks in the top 100. "Dans ma fusée" was the 77th best-selling singles during the first quarter of 2006 (from 1 January to 31 March 2006) and was certified Silver disc. It was ranked number 54 on the Year-End Chart.

On the Belgium (Wallonia) Ultratop 40 Singles Chart, the single debuted at number 36 on 5 November 2005, and reached a peak at number 13 two weeks later. It remained on the chart for only nine weeks.

In Switzerland, "Dans ma fusée" peaked at number 34 in its third week, on 1 January 2006.

Track listings
 CD single - France (Scorpio / Sony)

 Digital download

 CD maxi (Atollo)

Credits and personnel
 

 Vocal : Ilona
 Music / Text : Domydee, Laurent Jeanne, Mixivan
 Producer : Domydee, Ivan Russo
 Voice at beginning : Houston One 
 Chorus : Lena Nester, Rokhya-Lucie Dieng, Sophie Lemoine
 Additional chorus : Domydee, Noémie Brosset, Maïlis Mitrecey
 Acoustic guitars : Rosario Castagnola
 Bass : Ivan Russo

 Synthesizer and keyboards : Ivan Russo
 Accordion : Ivan Russo
 Arrangements : Ivan Russo and Domydee
 Voice recording : Philippe Vandenhende
 Mixing : Ivan Russo
 Recording at Atollorecording Studio in Naples, Italy, at Moneypenny Studio in Paris, France, with Franck Benhamou and Benoît Cinquin, and at Ty-Houam Studio in Préfailles, France, with Gilles Caballero

Charts and sales

Peak positions

Year-end charts

Certifications

Release history

References

2005 singles
Ilona Mitrecey songs